Nodoka Harada (原田 のどか, Harada Nodoka, born 9 August 1991) is a Japanese softball player. She competed in the 2020 Summer Olympics and won a gold medal.

References

1991 births
Living people
Softball players at the 2020 Summer Olympics
Japanese softball players
Olympic softball players of Japan
Asian Games medalists in softball
Softball players at the 2018 Asian Games
Medalists at the 2018 Asian Games
Asian Games gold medalists for Japan
Olympic gold medalists for Japan
Olympic medalists in softball
Medalists at the 2020 Summer Olympics
Competitors at the 2022 World Games
World Games silver medalists
World Games medalists in softball
21st-century Japanese women